The  Circular Head Football Association (CHFA) is an Australian rules football competition based in the Circular Head area of north-western Tasmania, Australia.  The CHFA currently features four clubs from small communities in the region and is the second oldest regional competition in Tasmania.

History
The CHFA was formed in 1900 as the West Wellington Football Association. The formation of the Smithton Football Club in 1918 prompted a reorganisation of football in the region, and the name of the competition was changed to the Circular Head Football Association in 1919. The original clubs in the West Wellington FA were Forest, Irishtown and Stanley and these three clubs and Smithton form the CHFA from 1919. During this period Irishtown won 10 premierships in a row, which is a Tasmanian record and the third longest premiership streak across Australia.

The competition remained stable and a two-year break was taken in 1942 and 1943 because of the second World War. Football resumed in 1944 with Irishtown defeating Smithton in the grand final that year. From 1947 to 1948, the CHFA was absorbed by an expansion of the North West Football Union but this ended in 1949. In 1951 Scotchtown and Marrawah joined the senior competition but they only lasted two seasons. However, as a merged entity they returned in 1962. The followed year Forest and Stanley merged to become the Forest/Stanley Football Club. Scotchtown dropped the "Marrawah" from its name after the 1975 season.

The departure of Smithton to the NWFU in 1980 prompted the promotion of Redpa, Trowutta and City from the reserve grade. Trowutta folded after the 1992 season and in 1996 they merged with City to form the Trowutta/City Football Club. The competition has remained more or less stable since then with Trowutta/City going into recess in 2010 for a year and permanently in 2015.

Premiers

'West Wellington FA
1900 Stanley
1901 Forest
1902 Forest
1903 Stanley
1904 Forest
1905 Forest
1906 Irishtown
1907 Irishtown
1908 Irishtown
1909 Irishtown
1910 Irishtown
1911 Irishtown
1912 Irishtown
1913 Irishtown
1914 Irishtown
1915 Irishtown
1916 World War 1
1917 World War 1
1918 Forest
'Circular Head FA
1919 Irishtown
1920 Irishtown
1921 Irishtown
1922 Irishtown
1923 Irishtown
1924 Irishtown
1925 Smithton
1926 Irishtown
1927 Irishtown

1928 Irishtown
1929 Smithton
1930 Irishtown
1931 Forest
1932 Irishtown
1933 Forest
1934 Forest
1935 Irishtown
1936 Stanley
1937 Irishtown
1938 Irishtown
1939 Forest
1940 Irishtown
1941 Stanley
1942 World War 2
1943 World War 2
1944 Irishtown
1945 Forest
1946 Stanley
1947 Stanley*
1948 Stanley*
1949 Smithton
1950 Forest
1951 Forest
1952 Smithton
1953 Irishtown
1954 Smithton
1955 Smithton
1956 Smithton
1957 Irishtown
1958 Smithton

1959 Smithton
1960 Smithton
1961 Stanley
1962 Smithton
1963 Smithton
1964 Smithton
1965 Forest/Stanley
1966 Smithton
1967 Smithton
1968 Smithton
1969 Irishtown
1970 Irishtown
1971 Smithton
1972 Forest/Stanley
1973 Forest/Stanley
1974 Irishtown
1975 Irishtown
1976 Irishtown
1977 Scotchtown
1978 Smithton
1979 Forest/Stanley
1980 Forest/Stanley
1981 Forest/Stanley
1982 Irishtown
1983 Irishtown
1984 Forest/Stanley
1985 Forest/Stanley
1986 Forest/Stanley
1987 Scotchtown
1988 Scotchtown
1989 Redpa

1990 Redpa
1991 Forest/Stanley
1992 Redpa
1993 City
1994 Redpa
1995 Irishtown
1996 Irishtown
1997 Trowutta/City
1998 Trowutta/City
1999 Forest/Stanley
2000 Redpa
2001 Forest/Stanley
2002 Forest/Stanley
2003 Trowutta/City
2004 Scotchtown
2005 Forest/Stanley
2006 Redpa
2007 Trowutta/City
2008 Irishtown
2009 Irishtown
2010 Forest/Stanley
2011 Irishtown
2012 Redpa
2013 Redpa
2014 Redpa
2015 Forest-Stanley
2016 Forest-Stanley
2017 Forest-Stanley
2018 Irishtown
2019 Redpa
2020 Competition in Recess Due to the COVID-19 Pandemic
2021 Scotchtown

* - As the Circular Head Division of the North West FU

Clubs

Current

Previous
 City  1980-1995 merged with Trowutta
 Forest 1900-1962  merged with Stanley
 Smithton 1918-1979 moved to NWFU in 1980
 Stanley  1900-1962 merged with Forest
 Trowutta 1980-1992 recess and then merged with City
 Trowutta-City 1996-2014 disbanded

2017 Ladder

2018 Ladder

References

Circular Head Council
Australian rules football competitions in Tasmania